"Don't Want To Leave You" is the third single by the English indie pop band Scouting for Girls to be released from their second studio album, Everybody Wants to Be on TV. The song was released as a digital download on 8 October 2010, with a CD released on 11 October 2010.

Promotion 
Scouting For Girls performed the track "Don't Want To Leave You" on 1 October 2010 on the 'National Lottery Euromillions Draw'.

Track listing

Music video 
The official music video to accompany the single "Don't Want To Leave You" was released on the band's website and YouTube on 3 September 2010.

Personnel 
Performance credits
 Vocals: Roy Stride, Greg Churchouse
 Bass: Greg Churchouse
 Percussion: Pete Ellard
 Piano: Roy Stride
 Guitar: Roy Stride

Technical credits
 Production: Andy Green

Chart performance

Release history

References

External links 
 
 Lyrics at scoutingforgirls.com
 Scouting for Girls official website 
 Scouting for Girls official YouTube channel

Scouting for Girls songs
2010 singles
2010 songs
Epic Records singles
Songs written by Roy Stride